David Scott Jaffe (born April 13, 1971) is an American video game designer best known for creating the Twisted Metal and God of War series.

Biography
Jaffe is originally from Birmingham, Alabama and currently resides in San Diego, California. He was born to a Jewish family. Jaffe graduated from Alabama's  Mountain Brook High School, located in Mountain Brook, AL, a suburb of Birmingham. Jaffe then attended the University of Southern California in Los Angeles.

Jaffe is known for directing the Twisted Metal series and God of War. Jaffe's Twisted Metal: Black and God of War have both ranked into IGN's "Top 25 PS2 Games of All Time", with Twisted Metal: Black in ninth place and God of War winning first place as IGN's best PS2 game of all time. In 2007, Jaffe left SCEA to found Eat Sleep Play. The studio signed a multi-year deal with Sony to create games exclusively for PlayStation platforms. He left Eat Sleep Play in February 2012 due to creative differences.

In 2014, Jaffe announced his first project on his new studio The Bartlet Jones Supernatural Detective Agency called Drawn to Death as a PlayStation 4 exclusive. The game received mixed reviews, and due to the cancellation of an unannounced title, his newfound company shut down a year later. Jaffe expressed disdain for the mixed critical reception and insisted the reception from players who played the game was more positive.

Since leaving his previous company, Jaffe now primarily live streams his show, Gabbin' + Games, formerly The Jaffe Stream, via Twitch and YouTube. Here, he openly converses with his audience via live chat and Discord about the past and current state of the video game industry, world events, pop culture, politics, metaphysics, the paranormal and existentialism, among other topics.

Jaffe has served as a creative consultant for Polish developer Movie Games.

Works
 Cliffhanger (1993) (NES, Super NES, Mega Drive/Genesis, Mega CD/Sega CD) - tester
 Skyblazer (1993) (Super NES) - tester
 Mickey Mania (1994) (Super NES, Mega Drive/Genesis, Mega CD/Sega CD) - designer
 Twisted Metal (1995) (PC/PlayStation) - designer
 Twisted Metal 2 (1996) (PC/PlayStation) - game director, producer, and designer
 Twisted Metal: Black (2001) (PS2) - Game Director / Lead Designer
 Kinetica (2001) (PS2) - Designer
 God of War (2005) (PS2) - Game Director / Lead Designer
 God of War II (2007) (PS2) - creative director
 Calling All Cars! (2007) (PS3) - game director
 Twisted Metal (2012) (PS3) - game director
 Drawn to Death (2017) (PS4) - game director

References

External links
David Jaffe's blog

Business Week
Wired.com
David Jaffe's Twitch.tv

1971 births
American video game designers
American video game directors
Jewish video game developers
Living people
People from Mountain Brook, Alabama
University of Southern California alumni